Dial 999 is a British television series that ran for one series of 38 episodes from 1958 to 1959. The series was a co-production between ITV contractor ABC Weekend TV, and American television producer Ziv Television Programs.
 
It stars Robert Beatty as Canadian Mountie Mike Maguire, and follows his work fighting crime alongside London's police. Named after the emergency telephone number for the United Kingdom, Beatty was essentially reprising his role in the 1946 film Appointment with Crime, in which he played Detective Inspector Rogers, a Canadian police officer attached to Scotland Yard.

The show contrasted Beatty's muscular brand of policing with that of his British colleagues, but failed to sell to North American markets.

In 2021, Network DVD released the whole series on DVD in a five disc set.

External links

 

1958 British television series debuts
1959 British television series endings
1950s British crime television series
British detective television series
English-language television shows
Television shows set in London
ITV television dramas
Television shows produced by ABC Weekend TV
Television series by MGM Television
Television shows shot at Associated British Studios